The 2013 Open GDF Suez Nantes Atlantique was a professional tennis tournament played on indoor hard courts. It was the eleventh edition of the tournament which was part of the 2013 ITF Women's Circuit, offering a total of $50,000+H in prize money. It took place in Nantes, France, on 28 October–3 November 2013.

WTA entrants

Seeds 

 1 Rankings as of 21 October 2013

Other entrants 
The following players received wildcards into the singles main draw:
  Audrey Albié
  Léolia Jeanjean
  Michaëlla Krajicek
  Kinnie Laisné

The following players received entry from the qualifying draw:
  Fiona Ferro
  Fiona Gervais
  Nicole Melichar
  Natalia Orlova

The following players received entry into the singles main draw as lucky losers:
  Margalita Chakhnashvili
  Teodora Mirčić
  Yvonne Neuwirth
  Christina Shakovets

Champions

Singles 

  Aliaksandra Sasnovich def.  Magda Linette 4–6, 6–4, 6–2

Doubles 

  Lucie Hradecká /  Michaëlla Krajicek def.  Stéphanie Foretz Gacon /  Eva Hrdinová 6–3, 6–2

External links 
 2013 Open GDF Suez Nantes Atlantique at ITFtennis.com
  

2013 ITF Women's Circuit
2013 in French tennis
Open Nantes Atlantique